Anthony Dirrell (born October 14, 1984) is an American professional boxer. He was a two-time WBC super middleweight champion, having held the title in 2019 and previously from 2014 to 2015. He is the younger brother of 2004 Olympic bronze medalist Andre Dirrell, who is also a professional boxer.

Professional career
Anthony Dirrell made his pro debut on January 27, 2005 against Henry Dukes. Dirrell stopped him in the first round. Dirrell had his next fight on February 11, 2005 against Dewayne Warren. Dirrell knocked Warren down twice in round one and twice again in round two. Dirrell won by TKO.

Dirrell had his third fight against Larry Brothers in which Dirrell won by TKO in the second round. Dirrell had his fourth fight against Mike Walthier knocking him out in the first round.

Dirrell had his fifth fight against Gabriel Rivera on August 13, 2005. Though Rivera was unbeaten in four fights, Dirrell won by TKO in the second. Dirrell had his sixth fight against Kevin Butts in which Dirrell knocked him out in the first round.

Dirrell had his seventh fight against Chris Grays in which Dirrell won by TKO in the first round. Dirrell had his eighth fight against Juan Carlos Ramos in which Dirrell won by TKO in the first round.

Dirrell had his ninth fight against James Morrow on June 23, 2006 in which Dirrell won by TKO in the first round. Dirrell won this fight in impressive fashion as he first knocked down Morrow with a huge right hand to the head, then followed up with a flurry in which Dirrell hit Morrow with a perfect left hook to the body which blew Morrow's mouthpiece out. Dirrell's tenth fight was against Billy Thompson in which he won by unanimous decision in 6 rounds.

On April 24, 2015 Anthony Dirrell debuted with Premier Boxing Champions vs. Badou Jack at the UIC Pavilion in Chicago, IL.

Dirrell vs. Bika 
Following a 23 fight win streak, Dirrell earned the opportunity to become the mandatory challenger for the WBC Super Middleweight title. He recorded his 24th consecutive victory with a win over Renan St-Juste, when his opponent could not continue due to a shoulder injury. After another pair of wins, on December 12, 2013, Dirrell faced champion Sakio Bika at the Barclays Center in Brooklyn, New York for the title. After 12 rounds, the judges ruled the fight a draw.

On August 16, 2014, at the StubHub Center in Carson, California, Dirrell faced Bika in a championship rematch. After another 12 rounds, the judges awarded the fight and the title to Dirrell by unanimous decision.

Dirrell vs. Jack 
Dirrell's next fight was on April 24, 2015 against Badou Jack at the UIC Pavilion in Chicago. Challenger Jack handed Dirrell his first full-fledged loss with a majority decision that saw the 31-year-old Swede control the fight through the middle rounds, relying on a strong jab and a confident aggression to outpoint Dirrell and win a majority decision victory.

WBC contention, injury

After Badou Jack vacated the WBC super middleweight title, WBC president Mauricio Sulaiman ordered Dirrell to face Callum Smith for the vacant belt. Following Smith's entry into the World Boxing Super Series, it was announced the fight for the vacant title would be between Dirrell and David Benavidez. On August 5, the WBC announced that Dirrell would be unable to compete due to injury and the bout for the vacant world title would be between Benavidez and Ronald Gavril.

Dirrell vs. Yıldırım 
On February 23, 2019, Dirrell fought WBC's #2 Avni Yıldırım for the vacant WBC super middleweight title. Dirrell fought well but had a hard time dealing with Yıldırım at times. The fight was scheduled for twelve rounds, but the ringside physician made the recommendation to stop the fight, since Dirrell was dealing with a cut over his left eye, caused by an accidental head clash in the seventh round. Dirrell was leading on two of the scorecards at the time of stoppage, 96-94 and 96-94, while the third judge had it 98-92 for Yıldırım, which was enough for a technical split decision win for Dirrell.

Dirrell vs. Benavidez 
In his first title defence, Dirrell faced David Benavidez. Benavidez, a former holder of the same belt, was undefeated and had never lost the belt in the ring. In a very competitive fight, Dirrell was fighting well in the opening four rounds. However, things started to go south for Dirrell in the fifth round, when he sustained a bad cut from a Benavidez jab. In the ninth round, after Benavidez unloaded a barrage of shots at Dirrell, Dirrell's corner decided to stop the fight.

Dirrell vs. Davis 
In his next fight, Dirrell fought Kyrone Davis in an eliminator for the WBC super middleweight championship. The fight ended in a split-decision draw, both fighters winning on one scorecard apiece, 115-113, while the third judge had the fight a draw, 114-114.

Outside the ring
It was announced by HBO Boxing After Dark announcer Larry Merchant on the June 16, 2007 telecast that Dirrell was currently undergoing chemotherapy for non-Hodgkin's lymphoma. He was cleared to box again after completing chemotherapy in 2008.

On January 28, 2008, Dirrell was held overnight in the Flint city lockup on suspicion of armed robbery.  However, no charges were ever filed.  Dirrell's grandfather claims that Dirrell was on his way to undergo chemotherapy for non-Hodgkin's lymphoma when the robbery took place.

Professional boxing record

References

External links
Anthony Dirrell profile at Premier Boxing Champions

Anthony Dirrell - Profile, News Archive & Current Rankings at Box.Live

1984 births
Living people
Boxers from Michigan
Sportspeople from Flint, Michigan
American male boxers
World Boxing Council champions
World super-middleweight boxing champions